Roko Strika (born 12 February 1994) is an Australian professional footballer who most recently played as a winger for Cooma Tigers.

References

External links
 

1994 births
Living people
Sportspeople from Canberra
Association football midfielders
Australian soccer players
Croatian footballers
NK Maksimir players
HNK Gorica players
NK Zagreb players
HNK Šibenik players
NK Imotski players
Croatian Football League players
First Football League (Croatia) players
National Premier Leagues players